Slalom skateboarding is a form of downhill skateboard racing that first appeared in the 1960s and 1970s and has made a resurgence in popularity in the 2000s. Slalom racers skate down a course usually marked by plastic cones. The racer tries to get through the course with the fastest time, while knocking down the fewest cones. Each cone typically carries a penalty of a fraction of a second (most often 0.1 seconds) which is added to the skater's time.

Disciplines
Races can be done in dual format where the racing is a head-to-head match, or in a single lane format where the racer is only racing against the clock. There are five types of Slalom race formats: Super Giant Slalom, Giant Slalom, Hybrid Slalom (a.k.a. Special Slalom), Tight Slalom, and Banked Slalom. The Super Giant Slalom, or SuperG, is characterized by fast speeds of 30-40 mph, very long distances between cones (up to 40–50 feet) and run times of around 1 minute. Giant Slalom is similar to SuperG but typically has shorted cone distances, more cones, and is often run in a single lane format. Hybrid or Special slalom is a combination of Giant Slalom cone spacings of 10-15' and tight cones spacings of 5-7' and is most often run head-to-head. Tight Slalom is characterized by very short cone distances of 5'-7' and has the highest frequency of turns. Tight slalom skaters will pass through 3-4 cones per second. Banked slalom involves skating through a course on banked walls, such as in a skatepark or in a drainage ditch. Banked slalom is similar to other forms of slalom except that it is almost never head-to-head and the course weaves through a non-level obstacle course, as opposed to a regular street where other forms of slalom are held.

Rules
The most unusual thing about slalom skateboard rules is that skaters are penalized a certain amount of time for each cone that they hit during a race. This penalty time is added to the racers' run time. If too many cones are hit during the run, the racer receives a Disqualification. A DQ is often penalized in head-to-head racing with a severe time penalty that is rarely made up in the second heat of a head-to-head race.
 
Another group of rules known as "Grass Roots" rules may be used to simplify the racing environment. In grass roots rules, racers are allowed to hit a certain maximum number of cones. Below the maximum (often 5 cones) there is no penalty, and above the maximum is a DQ. 

In all types of head-to-head racing, race order is determined by a qualifying time which determines the brackets for head-to-head match-ups.

Equipment
Slalom skateboards are optimized to increase speed, turning, and traction. Slalom skateboard wheels are generally softer (durometers between 76A and 90A) and larger than a typical skateboard wheel (diameter 66 - 75 mm). This increases the wheels' roll speed and grip. Skateboard trucks for slalom racing are often hand-machined precision products that include high rebound bushings, spherical bearings, and precision ground 8mm axles. Slalom trucks are different from most regular skateboard trucks, having different geometry for the front vs the rear truck. The front truck provides increased steering capability whereas the rear truck provides a more stable trajectory. Wedged (or angled) rubber pads (initially known as Rad Pads) mounted under the trucks, shifting the angle of the king pin, can be used to achieve similar performance with standard skateboard trucks. Skateboard decks (or boards) for slalom racing are generally slightly longer than typical skateboards, while still shorter than longboards. They are also more narrow suitable for truck widths of 100 to 120 mm. Materials may include carbon fiber and foam cores, to increase board responsiveness and strength. In the 1970s and 80's they initially had significant flex which provided a smooth ride, but as competitions got more intense racers favored decks completely without flex such as solid wood, rigid maple ply or carbon fiber.

Racers
Some of the early stars of Slalom racing were Henry Hester, Bobby Piercy and John Hutson. These skaters won many of the races of the 1970s. Immediately following the rebirth of the sport in the 2000s, with the organization of the 2001 World Championships of Slalom, put on by Jack Smith in Morro Bay, CA, racers such as Gary Cross, Paul Dunn, and Charlie Ransom dominated. In the following years some of the most successful racers were Kenny Mollica and Jason Mitchell in the US, Luca Giammarco (ITA) Maurus Strobel (SUI) and Dominik Kowalski (GER) in Europe for the men's division. In the women's division Lynn Kramer (USA), multiple World Champion, really stands out, winning more than 10 overall titles. Other top level racing women of this period include the 2003 World Champion, 1970's legend Judi Oyama (USA) and the Europeans Kathrin Sehl (GER) and Lienite Skaraine (LAT).

In recent years Joe McLaren (USA) has won more men's World Championship titles than any other previous racer, although he is regularly facing tough competition from Europeans such as Janis Kuzmins (LAT), Christopher and Michel Dupont (FRA) and the brothers Viking and Viktor Hadestrand (SWE). In North America the top contenders are currently Louis Ricard (CAN), Jonathan Harms (USA) and Joseph Kyle Smith (USA). Richy Carrasco (USA) a 1970s professional freestyle skateboarder and World Record holder of 360 spinning has also stayed a top contender and maintained a position in the top 10 Pro World Ranking for more than 11 years in a row between 2008 and 2019. Paul Price (of UK, now USA) has been a frequent traveler across Europe, North America and Australia and holds the record for the most races run. 

Among the women Lynn Kramer still holds strong, but in 2018 Mare Erika Belta (LAT) won both the World Championship title in tight slalom as well as the World Champions Super Final tight slalom title, both times racing Lynn Kramer in the finals. The other women placing in the top three, in either of the three slalom disciplines, at the ISSA World Championships in Policka, Czech Republic, 2018 were Karolina Vojtova (CZE), Endija Ruja (LAT) and Alina Krasavina (RUS). As if 2018 was only a temporary exception, in 2019 Lynn top once again became the World Champion in all three main slalom disciplines: tight, hybrid and giant slalom.

External links
SlalomSkateboarder.com - International Slalom Skateboarding Association (ISSA)
SlalomRanking.com - ISSA World Ranking with event calendar, results, race registrations

Skateboarding styles
Racing